Mexico–Oman relations are the diplomatic relations between the Mexico and Oman. Both nations are members of the United Nations. Neither country has a resident ambassador.

History
Both nations established diplomatic relations on 31 July 1975. Since the establishment of diplomatic relations, relations between both nations have been maintained mainly through international organizations such as at the United Nations. In 1986, Mexico opened an honorary consulate in Muscat. In February 2008, Mexican Director General for Africa and the Middle East, Ana Luisa Fajer, visited Oman and held meetings with the Secretary General of the Omani Foreign Ministry. Director Fajer also met with members of the Mexican community resident in Oman.

In October 2012, Mexican Foreign Undersecretary, Lourdes Aranda Bezaury, traveled to Oman and met with her counterpart, Ahmed Bin Yousuf Obaid Al-Harthi, where they held the first meeting of bilateral relations between both nations. Foreign Undersecretary Aranda expressed to her counterpart the interest of the Mexican government to strengthen political dialogue with Oman. In February 2013, Foreign Undersecretary Aranda, paid a second visit to Oman with the aim of promoting the candidacy of Dr. Herminio Blanco Mendoza to the post of Director-General of the World Trade Organization.

In February 2013, Oman and Mexico worked together in the development of an encyclopedia on the mango tree. Oman included Mexico in a technical-scientific project on the different types of mango, which has generated extensive cooperation between the governmental institutions of both countries. Scientists from the Royal Court of Sultan visited the Mexican states of Chiapas and Nayarit to conduct field research activities.

High-level visits
High-level visits from Mexico to Oman
 Director General for Africa and Middle East Ana Luisa Fajer (2008)
 Foreign Undersecretary Lourdes Aranda Bezaury (2012, 2013)

Agreements
Both nations signed a Memorandum of Understanding on the Establishment of a Common Interest Consultation Mechanism between the Mexican Secretariat of Foreign Affairs and the Omani Ministry of Foreign Affairs (2012). Currently, a Memorandum of Understanding for the Suppression of Visas for Diplomatic, Official, Special and Service Passport Holders and an Agreement to Avoid Double Taxation and Prevent Tax Evasion are currently being negotiated.

Trade
In 2019, trade between both nations totaled US$44 million. Mexico's main exports to Oman include: vehicles for the transport of goods, hot rolled tubes and control units or adapters. Oman's main exports to Mexico include: brake, urea and marble mechanisms.

Diplomatic missions
 Mexico is accredited to Oman from its embassy in Riyadh, Saudi Arabia and maintains an honorary consulate in Muscat.
 Oman is accredited to Mexico from its embassy in Washington, D.C., United States and maintains an honorary consulate in Mexico City.

References 

Oman
Mexico